Rentapia flavomaculata, also known as the yellow-spotted tree toad, is a species of toad in the family Bufonidae. It is endemic to the Malay Peninsula (Thailand and Malaysia). Before being described as a distinct species in 2020, it was confused with Rentapia hosii.

Etymology
The specific name flavomaculata is derived from Latin flavo (=yellow) and maculata (=spotted) and refers to the yellow spots that are diagnostic for this species.

Description
Adult males measure  and adult females  in snout–vent length. The snout is angular, truncate in dorsal profile, but slightly projecting beyond the lower jaw in lateral profile. The eyes are large. The tympanum is distinct. The fingers have basal webbing and large terminal discs. The toes are webbed and bear small terminal discs. Females have mostly smooth skin. The base color is light yellow, which turns dark grey when stressed and/or handled. There are bright yellow spots on the back, side of head, flanks, dorsal surface of limbs, gular, ventrolateral region, and chest. Males are uniform brown to orangish and lack distinct patterns, but have a higher degree of tuberculation.

Distribution
Rentapia flavomaculata is found in the Malay Peninsula south of the Isthmus of Kra, in southern Thailand and throughout Peninsular Malaysia. Rentapia from Sumatra have provisionally been assigned to Rentapia hosii but might represent Rentapia flavomaculata instead.

Habitat
Females are most readily observed when they descend to breed in pools of water along small or moderately sized forest streams. Males call from elevated perches.

Conservation
As of November 2021, this species has not been included in the IUCN Red List of Threatened Species. In 2014, Rentapia hosii, which then included what now is Rentapia flavomaculata, was considered of "least concern".

References

flavomaculata
Amphibians of Malaysia
Amphibians of Thailand
Taxa named by Robin Kurian Abraham
Taxa named by Chan Kin Onn
Amphibians described in 2020
Taxobox binomials not recognized by IUCN